Anton Afritsch (December 8, 1873 in Klagenfurt – July 7, 1924 in Graz) was an Austrian journalist and politician. He is best remembered as the initiator of the Kinderfreunde movement.

References

20th-century Austrian journalists
Social Democratic Party of Austria politicians
1873 births
1924 deaths
Politicians from Klagenfurt
Politicians from Graz
20th-century Austrian politicians
Writers from Klagenfurt
19th-century Austrian journalists